Rebel Moon Rising is a PC game produced by Theodore Beale (now known as Vox Day) made by Beale's Fenris Wolf studio and published by GT Interactive. A PlayStation version was also announced, but never released. In the game, the Moon has been colonized, and due to political conflicts, the Lunar colonies are rebelling against the United Nations. The player is on the side of the Lunar alliance, fighting against United Nation forces. The game later takes a twist, when an alien species is discovered.

This game is the sequel to Rebel Moon. With the same basis as Rising, the player takes on 27 levels in the original Rebel Moon, quite a few more levels than Rising. Rebel Moon was only released in a bonus disk with the Creative Labs hardware "3D BLASTER PCI". The series was also planned to have a third game, "Rebel Moon Revolution", but it was cancelled by GT Interactive. Due to insufficient communications about the cancellation, Fenris Wolf instated a lawsuit against GT Interactive.

The PC shareware version of Rebel Moon Rising is included on disc 2 of the EIDOS Interactive game Blood, copyright 1997.

A novelization of Rebel Moon, written by Bruce Bethke and Vox Day (the latter being a pseudonym of one of the game's developers), was published in 1996.

Reception 
Computer Gaming World described Rebel Moon Rising as technologically innovative and "highly creative", and declared that its escort missions broke new ground in 3D shooter mission design.

The game was commercially unsuccessful, according to Day, because the release of Quake at about the same time made gaming consumers look for 3D games, rather than the "2.5D" of RMR.

References

External links

 

1997 video games
Windows games
Windows-only games
Cancelled PlayStation (console) games
Video games set on the Moon
GT Interactive games
Video games developed in the United States
Video games scored by Rom Di Prisco
Video games with 2.5D graphics
Sprite-based first-person shooters